The Eastern Region (officially known as Al Ain Region is one of three Municipal Regions in the Emirate of Abu Dhabi. It forms the southeastern part of the United Arab Emirates. Compared to the Western Region, it is also a rather remote region of the Emirate, but smaller by area, and is not known to hold reserves of gas or petroleum, but is agriculturally important.

History and prehistory 

The city of Al-Ain, part of a historical region which also includes the adjacent Omani town of Al-Buraimi, is noted for its forts, oases, aflāj (underground water channels), and archaeological sites such as those of Hili and Rumailah. Sites outside the city include Jebel Hafeet and Al-A'ankah Fort. Sheikh Zayed bin Sultan Al Nahyan had been the Ruler's Representative in this region, before becoming the Ruler of Abu Dhabi and President of the United Arab Emirates. In March 2017, Sheikh Khalifa bin Zayed al-Nahyan renamed the region as Al Ain Region.

Demographics and settlements 

As of 2009, the population of the region was estimated at 890,000.

Aside from the main city, there are about 20 settlements which are governed by the region's municipal body, that is Al Ain Municipality. Most of them are estimated to have populations of no more than 10,000. They include:
 Al-Faqa' (partly in the Emirate of Dubai, on the road from Al-Ain to Dubai)
 Al-Hayer
 Al-Qu'a
 Al-Shwaib (on the road to Al Madam in the Emirate of Sharjah)
 Al-Wagan
 Al-Yahar
 Mezyad
 Nahel
 Remah
 Sa'ah
 Sweihan

See also 
 Abu Dhabi Region
 Al Ain International Airport
 Al-Buraimi Governorate (adjacent)
 Ash Sharqiyah (disambiguation)
 Lake Zakher
 List of tourist attractions in the United Arab Emirates
 Wildlife of the United Arab Emirates

References

External links 
 Al Ain Region to host Arab's first adventure tourism conference

 
Municipal regions in the Emirate of Abu Dhabi
Tawam, Eastern Arabia